Mary Dunne may refer to:
 Mary Chavelita Dunne Bright, better known by her pen name George Egerton
 Mary Dunne (scientist), Australian scientist and Sister of Mercy

See also
 I Am Mary Dunne, a 1968 novel by Brian Moore